Katarina is a feminine given name. It is the standard Swedish, Slovak, Serbo-Croatian, and Slovenian form of Katherine, and a variant spelling in several other languages.

In Croatia, it is the fourth most common female given name, or third if combined with the short form Kata. Historically in Croatia, the name Katarina has been among the most common feminine given names in the decades up to 1939, and then again between 1990 and 1999. In Serbia it is within the 10 most popular names for girls born since 1991.

Notable people with the given name include:

In acting:
 Katarina Ewerlöf, Swedish actress
 Katarina Čas, Slovenian actress
 Katarina Radivojević, Serbian actress

In royalty:
 Katarina Eriksdotter, daughter of the Swedish king Eric the Saint
 Katarina Kosača, Queen of Bosnia as the wife of King Stephen Thomas, the penultimate Bosnian sovereign
 Katarina Stenbock, third and last consort of Gustav I of Sweden and the Queen of Sweden

In sports:
 Katarina Witt, German figure skater
 Katarina Waters, English professional wrestler
 Katarina Srebotnik, Slovenian professional tennis player
 Katarina Tomašević, Serbian handball player
 Katarina Timglas, Swedish ice hockey player
 Katarina Lavtar, Slovenian alpine skier
 Katarina Krpež Slezak, Serbian handball player
 Katarina Vukomanović, Serbian volleyball player
 Katarina Ježić, Croatian handball player
 Katarina Johnson-Thompson, English track and field athlete
 Katarina Zavatska, Ukrainian tennis player
 Katarina Wolfkostin, American ice dancer

In other fields:
 Katarina Carroll, Australian police officer
 Katarina Cicak, Bosnian physicist
 Katarina Frostenson, Swedish writer
 Katarina Köhler (born 1954), Swedish politician
 Katarina Konstantinović, Serbian noblewoman
 Katarina Ivanovska, Macedonian model
 Katarina Kruhonja, Croatian peace activist
 Katarina Luhr (born 1973), Swedish politician

In fiction:
 Katarina (Doctor Who), early companion in the British television series Doctor Who
 Katarina Alves in the video game series Tekken
 Katarina in the anime Sailor Moon
 Katarina Cott in the video game Suikoden IV
 Katarina de Leon, the protagonist in the video game Pirates: The Legend of Black Kat
 Katarina du Couteau, the Sinister Blade, a playable champion character in the MOBA video game League of Legends
 Katarina Claes, the protagonist in the light novel My Next Life as a Villainess: All Routes Lead to Doom!
 Katarina, an alien character in the 2011 first-person shooter video game Conduit 2

See also
 Katharina

References

Feminine given names
Given names of Greek language origin
Swedish feminine given names
Serbian feminine given names
Croatian feminine given names
Slovene feminine given names